The Brotherhood of Railroad Signalmen (BRS) is a labor union in the United States. It represents workers who install, maintain, and repair railroad traffic control systems. These include switching, signaling, and highway-rail crossing warning systems on rail transport networks. Founded in 1901, it has a membership of approximately 10,500. It also represents employees who build railroad signal equipment.

The BRS is affiliated with the AFL–CIO and is a member of its Transportation Trades Department. Its headquarters is in Front Royal, Virginia.

Jerry C. Boles has served as president since 2019. Mike Baldwin has served as secretary-treasurer since 2019. Vice presidents include: Joe Mattingly, Jim Finnegan, Tim Tarrant, Cory Claypool, Brandon Elvey, and Doug VanderJagt.

External links
 Official website
 Brotherhood Of Railroad Signalmen Memorabilia held at the Kheel Center for Labor-Management Documentation and Archives, Cornell University Library

AFL–CIO
Canadian Labour Congress
Railway unions in the United States
Trade unions established in 1901